
420chan was an anonymous imageboard founded on 20 April 2005 by freelance web developer Aubrey Cottle. According to its founder, its name was a portmanteau of 420, a slang word originating in cannabis culture but now applicable to drug culture more generally, and 4chan, another imageboard website. Discussion on the site was primarily focused around recreational drug use and wrestling, with other boards related to topics including humor and academia.

While in its early history it was primarily known for hosting a board known as /i/, then used by the hacker collective Anonymous to stage "invasions" against individuals and web platforms such as Habbo Hotel, and Hal Turner. 

The modern incarnation of the website was primarily known for hosting discussions about psychoactive drugs legal and illegal. The site was also known for its LGBT discussion boards, /cd/ and /sd/.

As of 1 June 2022, 420chan's main URL, 420chan.org, has gone offline and has not reactivated, rendering the site inactive.

Footnotes

Notes

References 

Internet forums
Imageboards
Internet properties established in 2005
Anonymous social media
Drug culture
Cannabis culture
Canadian internet forums